WHLR (95.9 FM) is a silent radio station, formerly broadcasting a classic country music format. Licensed to Seelyville, Indiana, United States, the station serves the Terre Haute area. The station is currently owned by David Crooks, through licensee DLC Media, Inc.

History
The station went on the air as WAGD on 1993-12-17. On 1994-05-02, the station changed its call sign to WTHC, on 1999-12-01 to WWSY, and on 2012-06-12 to WXXR.

In May 2014, the website 959DukeFM.com was registered, and WXXR flipped to '90s-based Classic Country as 95.9 Duke-FM shortly after Noon on the 23rd. A Facebook page has been registered for the station, promoting that Duke-FM "Plays The Legends Of Country". On May 26, WXXR changed their call letters to WDKE, to go with the "Duke FM" branding.

On January 30, 2017, WDKE changed their call letters to WVIG and rebranded as "95.9 The Legend". This change coincided with the consummation of DLC Media's acquisition of WVIG from Midwest Communications.

On August 4, 2021, DLC Media filed a license assignment for a sale of WVIG to Educational Media Foundation, which planned to place its Air1 contemporary worship music format on the station.

On October 1, 2021, DLC took the station silent. On January 14, 2022, the station changed its call sign to WHLR.

Previous logo

References

External links

HLR
Radio stations established in 1997
1997 establishments in Indiana